Robert Murray may refer to:

Politicians
 Robert Murray (died 1672), of Cameron, Scottish politician
 Sir Robert Moray or Robert Murray (1609–1673), Scottish soldier, diplomat, natural philosopher; first President of the Royal Society of London
 Robert Murray (British Army officer, born 1689) (1689–1738), Scottish soldier and Member of Parliament
 Robert Maynard Murray (1841–1913), American politician and businessman
 Robert Murray (New Brunswick politician) (1853–1926)
 Robert Murray (co-operator) (1869–1950), British Labour Member of Parliament for West Renfrewshire, 1922–1924
 Robert J. Murray (born 1934), United States Under Secretary of the Navy
 Robert Murray (Maine politician) (born 1959)

Sportsmen

Footballers
 Robert Murray (Irish footballer) (died 1906)
 Robert Murray (Scottish footballer) (1915–?), played for Bath City, Heart of Midlothian, and Manchester United
 Bob Murray (Australian footballer) (born 1942), Australian rules footballer for St Kilda and Sandringham
 Rob Murray (footballer) (born 1974), English former footballer for A.F.C. Bournemouth

Other sportsmen
 Robert Murray (sport shooter) (1870–1948), British Olympic sport shooter
 Robert Lindley Murray (1892–1970), American tennis player
 Bob Murray (ice hockey, born 1948), Canadian ice hockey defenceman for the Atlanta Flames and Vancouver Canucks
 Robert Murray (ice hockey, born 1951), Canadian-born ice hockey defenceman who competed for Germany at the 1978, 1979, and 1981 World Championships
 Bob Murray (ice hockey, born 1954), Canadian ice hockey player for the Chicago Blackhawks and former general manager of the Anaheim Ducks
 Rob Murray (born 1967), Canadian ice hockey player and coach
 Robbie Murray (born 1976), Irish boxer

Other people
 Robert Murray (financier) (1635–1725?), English writer on commerce, and deviser of the first London penny post
 Robert Murray (died 1719), Scottish soldier
 Robert Murray (merchant) (1721–1786), American merchant
 Robert Murray (Royal Navy officer) (c. 1760–1834)
 Robert Murray (British Army officer, born 1689) (1689–1738)
 Robert Murray (physician) (1822–1913), physician and officer in the U.S. Army
 Robert Milne Murray (1855–1904), Scottish surgeon and medical author
 Robert Fuller Murray (1863–1894), Scottish poet
 Robert Murray (educator) (1888–1967), Scottish teacher and painter
 Robert George Everitt Murray (1919–2022), English-Canadian bacteriologist
 Robert K. Murray (1922–2019), American professor of history
 Robert Murray (artist) (born 1936), Canadian sculptor, printmaker, painter, and art teacher
 Robert E. Murray (1940–2020), American businessman; former chief executive officer of Murray Energy Corporation
 Bob Murray (businessman) (born 1946), British businessman and former chairman of Sunderland Football Club
 Robert C. Murray (1946–1970), American soldier and Medal of Honor recipient
 Robert P. Murray, American musician and teacher

See also
 Robert Morey (disambiguation)
 The name Bob Murray should not be confused with the character Bob Harris played by Bill Murray in the movie Lost in Translation